The 1929–30 Challenge Cup was the 30th staging of rugby league's oldest knockout competition, the Challenge Cup.

First round

Second round

Quarterfinals

Semifinals

Final
Widnes beat St Helens 10-3 in the Challenge Cup Final at Wembley played before a crowd of 36,544.

This was Widnes' first Cup final appearance and thus their first Cup final win.

References

Challenge Cup
Challenge Cup